The Al Mashaaer Al Mugaddassah Metro line, ( qtar al mashaaer al muqaddassah al khat diljanubi) is a metro line in the city of Mecca, Saudi Arabia.  Claimed to have the highest capacity of any metro in the world, it operates for seven days a year, and is used exclusively as a shuttle train for pilgrims between holy sites in Mecca, Mount Arafat, Muzdalifah and Mina to reduce congestion caused by thousands of buses and cars during the Hajj. It is the second metro system on the Arabian Peninsula, after the Dubai Metro (although, with its limited open hours, some consider it more of a shuttle train service).

The line opened on 13 November 2010, in time for the Hajj 1431 between 25–29 November 2010. It was built separately from, and will not be physically linked to, the future Mecca Metro network.

Services

Before completion, Saudi officials estimated the line would replace 53,000 buses, promising a safer, more comfortable pilgrimage. By the time of the 2011 Hajj (Hajj 1432) it was able to operate at 100% capacity and is estimated to have carried more than 3.95 million passengers making it, for that period, the most intensively used metro line in the world and among the busiest systems in the world. Each 12-car train carries 3,000 passengers and the headway is 150 seconds (24 trains per hour).

In peak periods the line operates with a special "group shuttle" schedule, better known as train movement "D", with three departure stations and three arrival stations. (At each holy site on the line there are three stations.) At off-peak times stopping-all-stations service is run, with various movements "A", "B", "C" and "E". Tickets are 250 riyals, except the last day when they are 100 riyals.

Operation contracts
In March 2010, Serco Middle East was awarded a contract by China Railway Construction Corporation Limited (CRCC) to advise on the operation and maintenance of the Makkah Metro. CRCC had been awarded the design, build, operate and maintain contract in 2008 by the Ministry of Municipal and Rural Affairs.

In November 2014, Metro project promoter Makkah Mass Rail Transit Co has selected Kuala Lumpur transport agency Prasarana to provide consultancy services during Phase 1 of the Makkah Public Transport Programme. Phase 1 covers the construction of two metro lines totalling 45.1 km and 22 stations, with commissioning scheduled by 2019.

During the 2014 Hajj, staff from Prasarana Malaysia and Express Rail Link helped to fulfil CRCC’s staffing requirement to support operations.

Beginning 2018, the contract once again held by China Railway Construction Corporation Limited after 3 years of operation by Prasarana.

Train movements

Construction history
The line was claimed to be the world's fastest design in the world, at 22 months, 16 months if religious habit is taken into consideration. It was initially operated at 35% capacity with automatic train protection to assist manual driving.

China Railway Construction Corporation Limited was responsible for infrastructure construction and systems integration under the 6.7-billion-riyal phase I contract which was awarded by the Saudi Arabian government in February 2009 following a visit by President Hu Jintao of China.

CRCC carried out construction of the project infrastructure and integrated and subcontracted various systems. The line was built in only 21 months by about 8,000 skilled and unskilled workers and approximately 5,000 engineers.

DBI (Deutsche Bahn International GmbH), a fully owned subsidiary of Deutsche Bahn AG and DAR Dar Al Handasah, were awarded with a contract from the Ministry of Municipalities and Rural Affairs of the Kingdom of Saudi Arabia to become the supervising engineers, responsible for design, construction, railway systems implementation and railway operations until today.

Several subcontracts were awarded. Al-Muruj Electromechanical Co. was awarded MEP works at all 9 stations. Siemens provided the overhead line catenary system supplied at 1500 V DC. Westinghouse Platform Screen Doors supplied the platforms with screen doors, Siemens power supplies, and WS Atkins is responsible for electrical and mechanical systems and project management. Thales supplied SelTrac Communications-Based Train Control, an operations control centre, CCTV, SCADA and passenger information systems. Systra supervised the civil work. Serco provides operations and maintenance consultancy. TÜV Rheinland were the Independent Competent Person (ICP) on the project and provided safety, operations, training, fire and systems assurance consultancy support including the development of System-Wide, O&M Safety Case and HSQE Management Systems. TÜV Rheinland also secured the Operating Licence and Safety Certificate for acceptance by the Saudi Railway Commission (SRC) in 2011, 2012 and 2013. Air conditioning solution was provided by SKM Sharjah, UAE.

Although the current metro uses conventional steel wheel on rail technology, it is sometimes incorrectly referred to as a 'monorail' due to cancellation on planned project in 2009.

CRCC losses on contract
In November 2010 CRCC claimed they had lost 4.15 billion yuan (~US$600 million) on the US$1.77 billion contract due to changes insisted on by the client. The earthworks alone reportedly increased two-and-a-half times from 2 million cubic metres to 5 million. CRCC was seeking, with Chinese government support, extra compensation from the Saudi Arabian government to help cover the losses.

Rolling stock

On 4 April 2009, CNR Changchun (now CRRC Changchun Railway Vehicles) was awarded a contract to supply 17 Type A 12-car metro trainsets. Each set has eight motor and four trailer cars, all with aluminium bodies. A Type A car is 22.3 metres long and 3 metres wide. Knorr-Bremse supplied the braking systems with modifications to suit sandy conditions. It also features 5 train doors per side.

The first trainset was shipped from China in May 2010 and the last arrived by the end of 2010.

See also 
 Saudi Railways Organization (SRO)
 Saudi Railway Company (SAR)
 Transport in Saudi Arabia
 Riyadh Metro

Notes

References

External links
 UrbanRail.Net – Al Mashaaer Al Mugaddassah Metro line
 Google Maps – Al Mashaaer Al Mugaddassah Metro line rail map

Rapid transit in Saudi Arabia
Railway lines opened in 2010